Edward Alabi Ajado (1 March 1929 – 26 December 1980) was a Nigerian sprinter. At the 1954 British Empire and Commonwealth Games, Ajado won a silver medal in the 4×110 yards relay  (with Muslim Arogundade, Abdul Karim Amu, and Karim Olowu) and finished fourth in the 100 yards.

References

External links
 

1929 births
1980 deaths
Athletes (track and field) at the 1952 Summer Olympics
Athletes (track and field) at the 1956 Summer Olympics
Nigerian male sprinters
Olympic athletes of Nigeria
Athletes (track and field) at the 1954 British Empire and Commonwealth Games
Commonwealth Games silver medallists for Nigeria
Commonwealth Games medallists in athletics
Medallists at the 1954 British Empire and Commonwealth Games